The 2004 Star World Championship were held in Gaeta, Italy between April 23 and May 1, 2004.

Results

References

External links
 

Star World Championships
Star World Championships
Sailing competitions in Italy